"Rocket 88" (originally stylized as Rocket "88") is a song that was first recorded in Memphis, Tennessee, in March 1951. The recording was credited to "Jackie Brenston and his Delta Cats", who were actually Ike Turner and his Kings of Rhythm. The single reached number one on the Billboard R&B chart.

Many music writers acknowledge its importance in the development of rock and roll music, with several considering it to be the first rock and roll record. In 2017, the Mississippi Blues Trail dedicated its 200th marker to "Rocket 88" as an influential record. The song was inducted into the Blues Hall of Fame in 1991, the Grammy Hall of Fame in 1998,
and the Rock and Roll Hall of Fame in 2018.

Composition and recording
The original version of the twelve-bar blues song was credited to Jackie Brenston and his Delta Cats, which reached number one on the R&B charts. Brenston was Ike Turner's saxophonist and the Delta Cats were actually Turner's Kings of Rhythm back-up band, who rehearsed at the Riverside Hotel in Clarksdale, Mississippi. Brenston sang the lead vocal and is officially listed as the songwriter. Turner led the band and is credited in some sources as composer.  

Brenston later said that the song was not particularly original; "they had simply borrowed from another jump blues about an automobile, Jimmy Liggins’ 'Cadillac Boogie. The song was a hymn of praise to the joys of the Oldsmobile Rocket 88 automobile which had recently been introduced, and was based on the 1947 song "Cadillac Boogie" by Jimmy Liggins.

Drawing on the template of jump blues and swing combo music, Turner made the style even rawer, superimposing Brenston's enthusiastic vocals, his own piano, and tenor saxophone solos by 17-year-old Raymond Hill. Willie Sims played drums for the recording.

A review of the record in Time magazine included:

The legend of how the sound came about says that Kizart's amplifier was damaged on Highway 61 when the band was driving from Mississippi to Memphis, Tennessee.  An attempt was made to hold the cone in place by stuffing the amplifier with wadded newspapers, which unintentionally created a distorted sound; Phillips liked the sound and used it. Peter Guralnick, in his biography of Sam Phillips has the amplifier being dropped from the car's trunk when the band got a flat tire and was digging out the spare.

Phillips offered this reminiscence about the amp in an interview with Rolling Stone: "the bass amplifier fell off the car. And when we got in the studio, the woofer had burst; the cone had burst. So I stuck the newspaper and some sack paper in it, and that's where we got that sound". Afterwards, Phillips had no complaints about the unusual effect the "fix" had created. "The more unconventional it sounded, the more interested I would become in it."

The song was recorded in the Memphis studio of producer Sam Phillips in March 1951, and licensed to Chess Records for release. The record was supposed to be credited to Ike Turner and his Kings of Rhythm featuring Jackie Brenston, but Jackie Brenston and his Delta Cats was printed instead. Turner blamed Phillips for this error since he is the one who licensed it to Chess. Turner and the band were only paid $20 each (US$ in  dollars) for the record, with the exception of Brenston who sold the rights to Phillips for $910.

Whether this was the first record of the rock'n'roll genre is debated. A 2014 article in The Guardian stated that "Rocket 88's reputation may have more to do with Sam Phillips's vociferous later claims he had discovered rock'n'roll". Time quotes The New Rolling Stone Encyclopedia of Rock & Roll and the Rock and Roll Hall of Fame as confirming that "Rocket 88 may well have been the first rock 'n' roll record".

In a later interview, however, Ike Turner offered this comment: "I don't think that ‘Rocket 88’ is rock ‘n’ roll. I think that ‘Rocket 88’ is R&B, but I think ‘Rocket 88’ is the cause of rock and roll existing".

Chart performance 
"Rocket 88" was the third-biggest rhythm and blues single in jukebox plays of 1951, according to Billboard magazine, and ninth in record sales. The single reached the top of the Best Selling R&B Records chart on June 9, 1951, and stayed there for three weeks and also spent two weeks at the top of the Most Played Juke Box R&B Records chart; spending a total of five weeks at number one on the R&B charts.

Influence

Ike Turner's piano intro on "Rocket 88" influenced Little Richard who later used it for his 1958 hit song "Good Golly, Miss Molly."

Sam Philips, the founder of Sun Records and Sun Studio, and many writers have suggested that "Rocket 88" has strong claims to be called the first rock'n'roll record. Others take a more nuanced view. Charlie Gillett, writing in 1970 in The Sound of the City, said that it was "one of several records that people in the music business cite as 'the first rock'n'roll record. It has been suggested by Larry Birnbaum that the idea that "Rocket 88" could be called "the first rock'n'roll record" first arose in the late 1960s; he argued that: "One of the reasons is surely that Kizart's broken amp anticipated the sound of the fuzzbox, which was in its heyday when 'Rocket 88' was rediscovered."

Music historian Robert Palmer, writing in The Rolling Stone History of Rock & Roll in 1980, described it as an important and influential record.  He noted that Hill's saxophone playing was "wilder and rougher" than on many jump blues records, and also emphasized the record's "fuzzed-out, overamplified electric guitar".  Writing in his 1984 book Unsung Heroes of Rock ‘n’ Roll, Nick Tosches, though rejecting the idea that it could be described as the first rock'n'roll record "any more than there is any first modern novelthe fact remains that the record in question was possessed of a sound and a fury the sheer, utter newness of which set it apart from what had come before."  Echoing this view, Bill Dahl at AllMusic wrote:

Rock art historian Paul Grushkin wrote:  Michael Campbell wrote, in Popular Music in America: And the Beat Goes On:

Ike Turner himself said, in an interview with Holger Petersen:

No matter which version deserves the accolade, "Rocket 88" is seen as a prototype rock and roll song in musical style and lineup, as well as its lyrical theme, in which an automobile serves as a metaphor for sexual prowess.

References

Bibliography

External links
 Rocket "88" - Lyon on Mississippi Blues Trail

1951 singles
1951 songs
Songs written by Ike Turner
Jackie Brenston songs
Bill Haley songs
Chess Records singles
Grammy Hall of Fame Award recipients
Song recordings produced by Sam Phillips
Songs about cars
Mississippi Blues Trail